James Tuck (born June 12, 1990) is a Canadian football fullback for the Montreal Alouettes of the Canadian Football League (CFL). He was drafted by the Alouettes in the fourth round of the 2014 CFL Draft. He played CIS football at York. Tuck also played junior football for the Newmarket Storm of the Ontario Varsity Football League.

Early years
Tuck played hockey at Cardinal Carter Catholic High School in Aurora, Ontario. He played hockey in the Aurora Minor Hockey Association and York Simcoe Express triple-A programs growing up. He did not play football in high school as Cardinal Carter Catholic was a non-football school. Tuck first played football for the Newmarket Storm of the Ontario Varsity Football League, where he played for two seasons.

University career
Tuck played for the York Lions of York University from 2010 to 2013. He was a linebacker his first two seasons before switching to defensive end for his last two years. He played in seven games for the team during his freshman year in 2010, recording 24.5 tackles and one pass breakup. Tuck appeared in three games for the Lions in 2011, totaling 9.5 tackles and one forced fumble. He started eight games for the team in 2012, accumulating 33 total tackles, 6.5 sacks, and one forced fumble. He won the Nobby Wirkowski Defensive MVP Trophy as the Lions' most valuable defensive player and played in the 2013 East West Bowl. Tuck started eight games his senior season in 2013, recording 41.5 tackles, 4.5 sacks, two pass breakups, one forced fumble and one fumble recovery. He again earned the Nobby Wirkowski Defensive MVP Trophy in 2013. He was in the Business and Society program at York.

Professional career
Tuck earned an invite to the CFL’s National Combine after participating in the Toronto regional combine.

Montreal Alouettes
Tuck was selected by the Montreal Alouettes with the 31st pick in the 2014 CFL Draft. He played in nine games for the Alouettes as a linebacker in 2014, totaling five special teams tackles. He also recorded four special teams tackles in two playoff games. Tuck played in five games for the team during the 2015 season, spending time at defensive end and fullback. He signed a one-year contract with the Alouettes on February 5, 2016. He was released by the Alouettes on July 2, 2016. He played in one game for the Alouettes in 2016.

Winnipeg Blue Bombers
Tuck was signed by the Winnipeg Blue Bombers on July 4, 2016. He was placed on the injured list on August 2 and was activated on August 25, 2016. He played in 14 games for the Blue Bombers in 2016.

Toronto Argonauts
In February 2017, he signed with the Toronto Argonauts. He was demoted to the practice squad on July 22 and was released by the Argonauts on August 21, 2017. He played in four games for the Argonauts in 2017, recording four special teams tackles.

Edmonton Eskimos / Elks
Tuck signed with the Edmonton Eskimos on August 30, 2017. He was released by the Eskimos on September 8 and re-signed on September 12, 2017. In seven games with Edmonton, Tuck recorded an impressive 16 tackles on special teams, as well as one forced fumble. He added another forced fumble during the playoffs; his performance in 2017 lead to his contract being extended for 2018. However, during April minicamp, Tuck was lost for the season to a ruptured Achilles tendon. Tuck returned to form in 2019, making 15 special teams tackles and forcing a fumble. He also received his first professional touch, a carry for five yards in Edmonton's season finale, which was Tuck's 58th game. He signed a contract extension through the 2021 season on January 11, 2021.

In the first game of the 2021 season, he recorded his first career reception on August 7, 2021, against the Ottawa Redblacks on the last play of the game where he fell one yard short of a game-winning touchdown. He played in all 14 regular season games in 2021 where he had one defensive tackle, four special teams tackles, and four receptions for 45 yards. However, he was released on December 28, 2021.

Saskatchewan Roughriders
On January 7, 2022, it was announced that Tuck had signed with the Saskatchewan Roughriders. He played in 15 regular season games where he had four catches for 38 yards and three special teams tackles. He became a free agent upon the expiry of his contract on February 14, 2023.

Montreal Alouettes (II)
On February 14, 2023, it was announced that Tuck had signed with the Montreal Alouettes.

References

External links
Montreal Alouettes bio
Just Sports Stats

Living people
1990 births
Canadian football fullbacks
Canadian football defensive linemen
Canadian football linebackers
York Lions football players
Montreal Alouettes players
Winnipeg Blue Bombers players
Toronto Argonauts players
Edmonton Elks players
Saskatchewan Roughriders players
Players of Canadian football from Ontario
Sportspeople from Aurora, Ontario